Kyle Schoonbee (born 8 November 1995) is a South African rower. He competed in the 2020 Summer Olympics.

References

1995 births
Living people
Rowers at the 2020 Summer Olympics
South African male rowers
Olympic rowers of South Africa
University of Cape Town alumni
21st-century South African people